Phaseolus angustissimus (common name slimleaf bean) is a perennial, herbaceous vine of the Fabaceae (legume) family, native to the American Southwest (particularly, Arizona, New Mexico, and Texas), as well as northern Sonora, Mexico. It is a close relative of the cultivated tepary bean (P. acutifolius), also native to the same region.

Description 
Phaseolus angustissimus is a perennial, herbaceous vine (to 2 meters) which trails along rocky, eroded hillsides. Its leaflets are distinctively narrow and waxy, it has a very deep, slightly thickened taproot, its flowers are magenta to purple and face upwards from the ground, and its pods are small and curved, yielding 2-4 seeds with a ridged seed coat and hypogeal germination. P. angustissimus has shown freezing resistance in field trials in Canada.

Uses
The Zuni people rub the crushed leaves, blossoms and powdered root on a child's body as a strengthener.

References

angustissimus
Flora of North America
Plants used in traditional Native American medicine